Francis Xavier (footballer) (born 20 March 1993) is an Indian professional footballer who last played as a striker for Gokulam Kerala FC in the I-League.

Career

Gokulam FC

In January 2017, Francis Xavier joined the new side Gokulam Kerala FC.

Career statistics

References

1993 births
Living people
Indian footballers
Association football forwards
I-League players
Gokulam Kerala FC players
Footballers from West Bengal